Anomalurus is the largest genus in the rodent family Anomaluridae, with four species.  It is the only genus in the subfamily Anomalurinae.

Species 
A. beecrofti - Beecroft's scaly-tailed squirrel
A. derbianus - Lord Derby's scaly-tailed squirrel
A. pelii - Pel's scaly-tailed squirrel
A. pusillus - dwarf scaly-tailed squirrel

Beecroft's scaly-tailed squirrel, Anomalurus beecrofti, is sometimes moved to its own genus, Anomalurops, but Dieterlen (2005) and other authorities consider it to be part of Anomalurus.

References 

Dieterlen, F. 2005. Family Anomaluridae. Pp. 1532-1534 in Mammal Species of the World a Taxonomic and Geographic Reference. D. E. Wilson and D. M. Reeder eds. Johns Hopkins University Press, Baltimore.

 
Anomalures
Taxa named by George Robert Waterhouse